The Karen Dunbar Show was a Scottish comedy sketch show that aired on BBC One Scotland, starring comedian and actress Karen Dunbar. It was produced by BBC Scotland. It also starred actor and musician Tom Urie.

Theme

The original theme tune which was used on Series 1 and 2, has a similar sound to the David Essex song Hold Me Close.

Concept

There were many recurring characters, such as Shoeless Josie, a blonde drunkard, often seen carrying a bag of chips, and Almost Angelic, a Pub 'n' Club duo from Ayrshire, consisting of Angela Silvery and her tolerant husband Ricky.

Episodes
To date, there have been three series of 6 episodes each (2003–2005) and one, the 2006 series, consisting of four.  Directors included Ron Bain and Iain Davidson.  Many writers contributed to the series, including: Gordon Robertson (2005), Graeme Sutherland (2003–2005) and Ben Verth (2005).
Series 1: 9 January 2003 to 12 February 2003.
Series 2: 20 February 2004 to 26 March 2004.
Series 3: 20 May 2005 to 24 June 2005.
Series 4: 17 March 2006 to 7 April 2006.

DVD release
Only Series 1 has received a DVD release (in the UK). As a result of being unable to obtain clearance for the use of copyrighted music, some sketches (including all of Almost Angelic's – despite being pictured on the artwork) are excluded from the DVD. The TV broadcasts however, contained them intact.

External links
 

The Karen Dunbar Show at The Comedy Unit

BBC Scotland television shows
2003 Scottish television series debuts
2006 Scottish television series endings
2000s Scottish television series
BBC Scotland television sketch shows
2000s British television sketch shows